The Samoan Passport is an international travel document that is issued to Samoan citizens.

As of 1 January 2017, Samoan citizens had visa-free or visa on arrival access to 114 countries and territories, ranking the Samoan passport 44th in terms of travel freedom according to the Henley Passport Index. Samoa signed a mutual visa waiver agreement with Schengen Area countries on 28 May 2015.

See also

Visa requirements for Samoan citizens

References

Passports by country
Government of Samoa
Foreign relations of Samoa
Samoa and the Commonwealth of Nations